Baron Anthony Denis Maurice George de Worms (4 January 1869 – 11 January 1938) was an Austrian aristocrat (by courtesy) and an English philatelist.

Biography

Early life
Anthony Denis Maurice George de Worms was born on 4 January 1869. His father was George de Worms, 2nd Baron de Worms (1829–1902) and his mother, Louisa de Samuel. He had a brother, Percy de Worms (1873–1941) and a sister, Henrietta Emmy Louisa Amelia de Worms (1875-unknown). His paternal grandfather, Solomon Benedict de Worms (1801–1882), owned large plantations in Ceylon and was made a Hereditary Baron of the Austrian Empire by Franz Joseph I of Austria (1830–1916), and his paternal grandmother was Henrietta Samuel. His family was Jewish.

His paternal great-grandmother was Schönche Jeannette Rothschild (1771–1859), thus his paternal great-great-grandfather was Mayer Amschel Rothschild (1744–1812), the founder of the Rothschild banking dynasty. As a result, his paternal great-great-granduncles were Amschel Mayer Rothschild (1773–1855), Salomon Mayer von Rothschild (1774–1855), Nathan Mayer Rothschild (1777–1836), Carl Mayer von Rothschild (1788–1855), and James Mayer de Rothschild (1792–1868). His great-uncles, who owned plantations in Ceylon with his grandfather, were Maurice Benedict de Worms (1805–1867) and Gabriel Benedict de Worms (1802–1881). His paternal uncle was Henry de Worms, 1st Baron Pirbright (1840–1903).

Adult life
He was a Fellow of the Royal Philatelic Society and the Royal Society of Literature.

He became 3rd Baron de Worms in 1902, but renounced his aristocratic title in 1920.

Personal life
He married Louisa Matilda Goldsmidt, daughter of Moritz A. Goldsmidt, in 1901. They had two sons and one daughter:
 Charles de Worms (1903–1979).
 George Gerald Percy de Worms (1904–1968).
 Violet Henrietta Louisa de Worms (1912–1984).

They resided at Milton Park in Egham, Surrey.

References

1869 births
1938 deaths
People from Egham
Fellows of the Royal Philatelic Society London
Fellows of the Royal Society of Literature
English Jews
Rothschild family
British philatelists
Signatories to the Roll of Distinguished Philatelists